Bumetopia albovittata is a species of beetle in the family Cerambycidae. It was described by Stephan von Breuning in 1950. It is known from the Philippines.

References

Homonoeini
Beetles described in 1950